Longitarsus agilis is a species of beetle from the Chrysomelidae family that can be found in Belgium, Germany, Great Britain, France, and the Netherlands.

References

agilis
Beetles described in 1868
Endemic fauna of Spain
Beetles of Europe